Cho Namchul (November 30, 1923 – July 2, 2006, alternately Cho Namcheol) was a professional Go player (Baduk in Korean). He died of natural causes in Seoul at the age of 83.

Biography
Cho was born in a farming village in Buan, North Jeolla Province. In 1934, Japanese professional Kitani Minoru visited Korea and played with ten-year-old Cho, who deeply impressed the great master. He went to Japan in 1937 to study go as Kitani's first insei, or live-in student. In 1943, he returned to Korea and played a key role in the founding of the Hanguk Kiwon. It wasn't until 1983, that he would be awarded 9 dan, but for most of the 1950s and 1960s, he won the vast majority of national tournaments.

He is known as the founder of Korean modern Go. Namchul is also the uncle of the top Japanese Go title holder Cho Chikun.

After his death, he was honored by the president of Korea with a medal and floral tribute.

Titles and runners-up
Ranks #7 in total number of titles in Korea.

References

External links
Biography at "Sensei's Library"
Obituary article with portrait photo

1923 births
2006 deaths
South Korean Go players
Pungyang Jo clan